Norge Luis Vera Peralta (born October 3, 1971 in Siboney, Santiago de Cuba Province) is a right-handed baseball pitcher, who has been a frequent member of the Cuba national baseball team.

In Cuba, Vera pitches for Santiago de Cuba of the Cuban National Series. He has been a dominating force for years, including the 1999–2000 series, when he led the league with a 0.97 ERA, 17 victories and eight shutouts—all in a 90-game season. He then pitched in the second game of the 1999 Baltimore Orioles–Cuba national baseball team exhibition series.

Vera was seriously injured in November 2009, while trying to stop a fight as an uninvolved bystander in Santiago, Cuba. He was struck in the face by a blunt instrument, sustaining several fractures to the upper jaw. Zadys Navarro, one of Vera's doctors, indicated that reconstructive surgery would be required.

His son, Norge Vera, plays in the Chicago White Sox organization.

References

1971 births
Living people
2009 World Baseball Classic players
Olympic baseball players of Cuba
Olympic gold medalists for Cuba
Olympic silver medalists for Cuba
Olympic medalists in baseball
Medalists at the 2000 Summer Olympics
Medalists at the 2004 Summer Olympics
Medalists at the 2008 Summer Olympics
Baseball players at the 2000 Summer Olympics
Baseball players at the 2004 Summer Olympics
Baseball players at the 2007 Pan American Games
Baseball players at the 2008 Summer Olympics
Pan American Games gold medalists for Cuba
Baseball players at the 1999 Pan American Games
Baseball players at the 2003 Pan American Games
Pan American Games medalists in baseball
Medalists at the 1999 Pan American Games
Medalists at the 2003 Pan American Games
Medalists at the 2007 Pan American Games
People from Santiago de Cuba Province
21st-century Cuban people